Casa Fernando Pessoa ("Fernando Pessoa House") is a cultural center in Campo de Ourique of Lisbon, Portugal.

History
It was created in honor of the poet Fernando Pessoa, and conceived as a "home of poetry". It is located in the building where Pessoa lived between 1920 and 1935.

The cultural center opened on November 30, 1993.

External links
 Casa Fernando Pessoa—

Cultural centers
Buildings and structures in Lisbon
Houses in Portugal
Cultural infrastructure completed in 1993
1993 establishments in Portugal